Petrit Fejzula (born December 16, 1951) is a Yugoslav former handball manager and player. He was a member of the Yugoslavia national handball team. Fejzula was part of the team at the 1978 and 1982 World Men's Handball Championship. He is the brother of former politician and engineer Kaqusha Jashari.

Honours
Barcelona
Copa del Rey: 1982–83, 1983–84, 1984–85
Cup Winners' Cup: 1983–84, 1984–85

References

External links

1951 births
Living people
Sportspeople from Pristina
Yugoslav male handball players
Yugoslav expatriates in Spain
Yugoslav expatriate sportspeople in Spain
RK Crvena zvezda players
Liga ASOBAL players
FC Barcelona Handbol players
Yugoslav handball coaches